Merosargus sexnotatus is a species of soldier fly in the family Stratiomyidae.

Distribution
Brazil.

References

Stratiomyidae
Insects described in 1941
Diptera of South America
Endemic fauna of Brazil